Konstantina Kefala (born 9 August 1977 in Las Vegas, Nevada) is a Greek long-distance runner. She competed in the marathon at the 2012 Summer Olympics, placing 104th with a time of 3:01:18.

References

1977 births
Living people
Greek female long-distance runners
Greek female marathon runners
Olympic athletes of Greece
Athletes (track and field) at the 2012 Summer Olympics
Sportspeople from the Las Vegas Valley
American female long-distance runners
21st-century American women